Sian Barbara Allen (born July 12, 1946) is a former American actress who mainly appeared on television throughout the 1970s. A native of Reading, Pennsylvania, Allen studied at the Pasadena Playhouse before appearing in her first screen role on the series O'Hara, U.S. Treasury in 1971. She went on to appear in numerous television series in the ensuing years, including recurring appearances on The Waltons, Gunsmoke, and Ironside.

She also starred in several television films, including Scream, Pretty Peggy (1973) and The Lindbergh Kidnapping Case (1976). In addition to her television credits, Allen starred in two feature films: the thriller You'll Like My Mother (1972) and the Western Billy Two Hats (1974). For her performance in You'll Like My Mother, Allen was nominated for a Golden Globe Award for New Star of the Year.

Biography

She studied at the Pasadena Playhouse (1964–1965). She appeared in You'll Like My Mother (1972), starring Patty Duke, Rosemary Murphy and Richard Thomas. For this role, Allen was nominated for the 1973 Golden Globe Award as Most Promising New Actress.

She later appeared in two episodes of the popular TV series  The Waltons (1973) as Jenny Pendleton, an early love interest of John-Boy Walton (reuniting her with Thomas, who played John-Boy and with whom she had appeared in You'll Like My Mother the previous year). Allen and Thomas were themselves described as "together these days", and Thomas wanted Allen to play the Pendleton role. She played the title role in the 1973 ABC Movie of the Week, Scream, Pretty Peggy.

Allen appeared on television programs such as Captains and the Kings; The Incredible Hulk; Ironside; The Rockford Files; Alias Smith and Jones; Bonanza; Kojak; Gunsmoke; Love, American Style; Columbo: Lovely but Lethal; Cagney & Lacey; Adam-12; and Hawaii Five-O. In 1974 she was the lead actress in the western Billy Two Hats, alongside Gregory Peck and Jack Warden. In 1976, she portrayed Anne Morrow Lindbergh in the television movie The Lindbergh Kidnapping Case, based on the real-life Lindbergh baby kidnapping/murder. 
Her last role was in an episode of L.A. Law in 1990, after which she retired from acting.

Personal life
She married and had a daughter. Her own mother and father divorced around 1965. She is the older sister of flash fiction author, editor and teacher Meg Pokrass.

Filmography

References

External links

 

 

1946 births
Living people
American film actresses
American television actresses
Actors from Reading, Pennsylvania
Actresses from Pennsylvania
20th-century American actresses
21st-century American women